Dharmaatmudu is a 1983 Indian Telugu-language drama film directed by Bairisetty Bhaskara Rao and produced by K. Kesava Rao. The film stars Krishnam Raju and Jayasudha. The film had musical score by Chellapilla Satyam. It was remade in Tamil as Nallavanuku Nallavan, in Kannada as Jeevana Chakra and in Hindi as Mera Saathi.

Cast
Krishnam Raju
Jayasudha
Gummadi

Soundtrack

Reception

Awards
Nandi Award for Best Actress - Jayasudha

References

External links

1983 films
Indian drama films
Telugu films remade in other languages
Films scored by Satyam (composer)
1980s Telugu-language films